In Search of Elusive Little Comets is the debut studio album by Newcastle band Little Comets. The album was released on 31 January 2011, both digitally and physically. It included four singles: "Adultery", "One Night in October", "Isles" and "Joanna". The record received mixed reviews and peaked at number 54 in the UK Albums Chart.

Musical style
The album opens with many "strong kicking choruses...ridden with a funky, feel-good, indie disco pound and tight guitar riffs". It "continues to emphasize Little Comets' variety and eclecticism". In sum, it is "an album containing fun, danceable, eclectic eccentricity, a slick, fresh indie vibe and a concluding powerful ballad".

Track listing

Singles

Charts

Personnel
 Robert Coles - Lead Vocals & Guitar
 Michael Coles - Lead Guitar
 Matthew 'the cat' Hall - Bass
 Mark Harle - Drums

References

Little Comets albums
2011 debut albums